is a JR West Geibi Line station in Shimokōjiro, Shingō, Niimi, Okayama Prefecture, Japan.

History
Sakane Station was opened on February 10, 1930, with the creation of the Sanshin Line between Yagami Station and Bitchū Kōjiro Station. It became part of JR West in 1987 when Japan National Railways was privatized. An enclosed waiting room was constructed in 2004 for the convenience of passengers.

Station layout
The Sakane Station is a ground-level one platform station, though it formerly had two platforms on two rail lines (see photo at bottom right).

Highway access
Route 182
Okayama Prefectural Route 200, Sakane Teishajō Route

Connecting lines
All lines are JR West lines.
Geibi Line
Local: Bitchū Kōjiro Station — Sakane Station — Ichioka Station

External links
 JR West

Geibi Line
Railway stations in Okayama Prefecture
Railway stations in Japan opened in 1930